TVL or tvl can refer to:

 TV Licensing, trade name used by BBC subcontractors operating in the UK
 Television lines, image resolution specification
 Tuvaluan language code
 Troy Van Leeuwen, known as TVL
 Yamaha SA503 TVL guitar, named for Van Leeuwen
 Telecom Vanuatu Limited, see Telecommunications in Vanuatu#Telephone
 Lake Tahoe Airport, California, US, IATA code
 Enterprise Volleyball League, Taiwan
 Tenth value layer in radiation physics
 TV Land, an American television network
 Technical Vocational Livelihood, an alternative term for vocational education
 RAAF Base Townsville, IATA airport code "TSV"